Clarke is an Irish surname.

Clarke may also refer to:

Places
 4923 Clarke, an asteroid named for Sir Arthur C. Clarke
 Clarke City, Quebec, Canada
 Clarke City, the former name of Greenfield, California
 Clarke County (disambiguation)
 Clarke Glacier (disambiguation), three glaciers in Antarctica
 Clarke Island (Tasmania), Australia
 Clarke Quay, Singapore, an historical riverside quay
 Clarke Range, mountain range in Queensland, Australia
 Clarke River (disambiguation), various rivers
 Clarke Sound, Nunavut, Canada
 Clarke's Gap, a mountain pass west of Leesburg, Virginia
 Lake Clarke, a reservoir in Pennsylvania

Schools
 Clarke College, a Baptist institution which merged into Mississippi College
 Clarke School for the Deaf, in Northampton, Massachusetts
 Clarke University, a Roman Catholic institution in Dubuque, Iowa

Other uses
 Clarke (given name)
 Clarke baronets, in the Baronetage of England or the Baronetage of the United Kingdom
 Clarke Energy, a privately owned multinational company specialising in power plants utilising gas engines
 Clarke Historical Museum, in Eureka, California, USA
 Clarke Medal, an Australian medal for distinguished work in the Natural sciences
 Clarke Stadium, Edmonton, Alberta, Canada
 HP Clarke, a CPU in certain Hewlett-Packard programmable calculators

See also
 Clarke House (disambiguation), various buildings on the National Register of Historic Places
Clarkesville
Clarksville (disambiguation)
 Justice Clarke (disambiguation)